Liolaemus pantherinus, the panther tree iguana, is a species of lizard in the family Iguanidae.  It is from Peru, Bolivia and Chile.

References

pantherinus
Lizards of South America
Reptiles of Peru
Reptiles of Bolivia
Reptiles of Chile
Reptiles described in 1909
Taxa named by Raymond Laurent